is a Japanese wrestler who participated at the 2010 Summer Youth Olympics in Singapore. She won the gold medal in the girls' freestyle 46 kg event, defeating Lulia Leorda of Moldova in the final.

References 

Wrestlers at the 2010 Summer Youth Olympics
Japanese female sport wrestlers
Living people
Year of birth missing (living people)
Youth Olympic gold medalists for Japan
Asian Wrestling Championships medalists
21st-century Japanese women